The Kwara State Executive Council (also known as the Cabinet of Kwara State) is the highest formal governmental body that plays important roles in the Government of Kwara State headed by the Governor of Kwara State. It consists of the Deputy Governor, Secretary to the State Government, Chief of Staff, Commissioners who preside over ministerial departments, and the Governor's special aides.

Functions
The Executive Council exists to advise and direct the Governor. Their appointment as members of the Executive Council gives them the authority to execute power over their fields.

Current cabinet
The current Executive Council is serving under the AbdulRahman AbdulRazaq administration.

Principal Officers

Commissioners
In January 2021, AbdulRazaq dismissed all commissioners and ordered the outgoing appointees to hand over to the top civil service officer in their ministries.

Special Advisers

Special Advisers

Senior Special Assistants

Permanent Secretaries

Permanent Secretaries for Ministerial Departments

Permanent Secretaries for Extra-Ministerial Departments

References

Kwara
Kwara State
|}